The GE C44-9W is a  diesel-electric locomotive built by GE Transportation Systems of Erie, Pennsylvania. Keeping in tradition with GE's locomotive series nicknames beginning with the "Dash 7" of the 1970s, the C44-9W was dubbed the Dash 9 upon its debut in 1993.

Part of GE's "Dash 9" series of locomotives, the Dash 9-44CW shares its frame, HiAd trucks, 16-cylinder 7FDL engine, and 752AH-31 traction motors with the GE Dash 9-40CW. But while the more common 9-44CW offers 4,400 horsepower (3,300 kW), software in the 9-40CW's engine-governing unit restricts its power output to 4,000 horsepower (3,000 kW).

The design has since proven popular with North American railroads, although some railroads, such as CSX and Canadian Pacific, preferred its AC equivalent, the AC4400CW. Because of more stringent emissions requirements that came into effect in the United States on January 1, 2005, the Dash 9-44CW has been replaced in production by the GE ES44DC.

Many North American railroads have ordered the C44-9W. They were originally ordered by Chicago & North Western Railway, Santa Fe, BNSF, CSX, Southern Pacific, Canadian National Railway, BC Rail, and Union Pacific Railroad. Norfolk Southern purchased the very similar Dash 9-40CWs.

Rebuilds 
The BNSF AC44C4M is a Ex-ATSF GE C44-9W rebuilt with AC traction motors and an A1A-A1A wheel arrangement. The internal controls are similar to those of the newer GE ES44C4.

Original owners

Gallery

See also 
 GE C38AChe, based on the GE Dash 9-44CW design and operating on the Qinghai-Tibet route in China

References

External links 

 9-44CW pictures Trainspo

A1A-A1A locomotives
C-C locomotives
Diesel-electric locomotives of the United States
Diesel locomotives of Western Australia
Freight locomotives
C44-9W
Railway locomotives introduced in 1993
Standard gauge locomotives of the United States
5 ft 3 in gauge locomotives
Standard gauge locomotives of Canada
Standard gauge locomotives of Australia
Diesel-electric locomotives of Australia